There are a number of lines of defence against pests (that, those animals that cause damage to the plants we grow) and diseases in the orchard, principal among these being the practice of good husbandry, creating healthy soil and ensuring high standards of garden hygiene. But no matter how diverse and healthy the garden eco-system may be, there will always be a degree of  disease and pest presence. In many ways, some level of pathogen population in the garden can be not only acceptable but desirable as they are indicative of a generally healthful and diverse environment, and add to the overall robustness of the system as an immunity to such detrimental influences will build up, particularly in a balanced polycultural regime. Indeed, most of the plants we grow will tend to be selected because they are trouble free, and those that are more susceptible to attack will have fallen by the wayside over time. However, most farmers find it unacceptable that the food crops they grow are damaged by pests.

For these crops there has been considerable research and selective breeding carried out in order to find cultivars that are resistant or immune to pest and disease damage. Breeding for plant disease resistance generally has involved finding suitable genetic material amongst existing stocks or in the wild, which is then incorporated into commercial varieties.

Example: The apple

In the case of apples, in which research is being carried out in order to develop resistance to diseases such as apple scab (Venturia inaequalis), powdery mildew (Podosphaera leucotricha), orchard fireblight (Erwinia amylovora), woolly apple aphid (Eriosoma lanigerum) and collar rot (Phytophthora cactorum), the main sources of resistant material used in breeding programmes such as those being run by East Malling Research Station in England or Hortresearch in New Zealand are major gene resistances derived from crab-apples. The Vf gene for black spot resistance is derived from the ornamental crab-apple species Malus floribunda. Most black spot resistant cultivars developed around the world carry this gene, but there are some selections that carry the Vr (from Malus pumila) or Vm (from M. micromalus) genes. Major gene resistances to powdery mildew are derived from Malus × robusta (Pl1) and Malus × zumi (Pl2), and the apple cultivar 'Northern Spy' has a long-standing reputation for its major gene resistance to woolly apple aphid. Since early this century this resistance has been used to develop woolly aphid resistant rootstocks such as MM.106 and M.793. Much later it was shown that the cultivar was also very resistant to collar rot and a useful breeding parent for this resistance.

Resistance and immunity
Some plants can tolerate the presence of large numbers of insects without being severely affected. This is not very satisfactory however as insects will still cause damage, and in fact further breeding and population expansion of the pest species is supported. Other varieties are less attractive to pests, but this can be difficult to sustain or demonstrate.
The most valuable form of resistance is where the pest cannot survive as well on one variety as on another. In some cases this can actually make the plants immune to attack, as is the case with the lettuces 'Avoncrisp' and 'Avondefiance' which were bred at the Institute of Horticultural Research, Wellesbourne during the 1960s, which are fully resistant to lettuce root aphid (Pemphigus bursarius).

Trade-off of breeding for resistance
Sometimes however there can be a trade-off, for those varieties which have increased immunity or resistance may be lacking in other qualities such as flavour, yield or quality. Celery resistant to the fungus (Fusarium oxysporum) may not succumb to this disease, but may also be unacceptably short, ribby and low yielding.
Further, a cultivar that is resistant to one disease may be more susceptible to another that is equally important. A lettuce cultivar that is resistant to mosaic virus may be sensitive to corky root disease, whilst another that resists corky root may be vulnerable to downy mildew (Brim lactic).
Another drawback to resistance is that depending on the host pathogen system, resistance is sometimes not long lasting as new pathogen strains quickly develop, and further research and breeding is constantly needed.

Availability of resistant varieties
Resistant varieties are not available for all crops. For several of the most damaging plant diseases, such as Potato blight (Phytophthora infestans) and white rot (Sclerotic cepivorum) of the Allium genus, no acceptable resistant cultivars are yet available. In addition, commercial seed companies and plant breeders rarely invest resources into developing resistant cultivars for more minor or speciality crops, which often tend to be those of greater interest to the organic grower.

In general it is probably fair to say that resistance will not fully guarantee total crop protection, but choosing resistant varieties should rather be considered as a part of an overall Integrated pest management strategy, especially against virus diseases. In particular they can be especially useful where the threat from specific pests and diseases is high.

Table of resistant crops
The table below illustrates a number of pest and disease resistant vegetable crop varieties, although should not be considered comprehensive.

See also 
Plant disease resistance
Plant pathology
Plant defense against herbivory

Lists of plants
Gardening lists
 
Plant immunity